African youth bests in the sport of athletics are the all-time best marks set in competition by African athletes aged 17 or younger throughout the entire calendar year of the performance. Confederation of African Athletics (CAA) doesn't maintain an official list for such performances. All bests shown on this list are tracked by statisticians not officially sanctioned by the governing body.

Outdoor

Key:

+ = en route to a longer distance

h = hand timing

A = affected by altitude

NWI = no wind measurement

Boys

Girls

Indoor

Boys

Girls

Notes

References

Youth
African